Yesisca Iskandar or known as Jessica Iskandar  (born January 29, 1988) is an Indonesian actress, model, presenter, singer, businesswoman, comedian and writer. She is also known by her nickname, Jedar.

Early life
Born in Jakarta, Jessica grew up in an interfaith family, as her father, Hardi Iskandar, is a Muslim and her mother, Wulandari, is a Christian. She is the youngest in the family and the only daughter, having 4 older brothers.

Jessica finished her high school education at Bunda Mulia School. She continued her studies at Trisakti University, Jakarta, majoring in Interior Design. After three semesters, she decided to quit the university to concentrate on her career.

Career
Jessica began her career as a model. She attended John Casablanca modeling school. She made her first movie debut in 2005 as Kara in Dealova. Her next movie was Diva (2007) which was produced in Malaysia.

From 2008 to 2012 Jessica starred in several soap operas and FTV (Television Movie) such as Gadis Pengantar Telur (2010) with Vino Bastian, Cinta Pura-Pura Nyasar (2010) alongside Rio Dewanto and Vicky Nitinegoro.

In February 2013, Jessica published her first autobiography, JEDAR: Jessica Is Jessica. In December 2014, Jessica published her second autobiography, Jedar Power: Love, Life, Lord which recounted her experiences while she was expecting her first child, El Barack Alexander.

Jessica began her career as a Presenter at Dahsyat on RCTI from March 2011 to 2013. In 2012, Jessica was appointed as Indonesia Earth Hour ambassador.

In September 2018, Jessica was invited to serve as a guest judge in Asia's Next Top Model Season 6 Episode 6 in Thailand.

In 2018, Jessica started co-hosting a talkshow on TransTV, Ngopi Dara, with Nia Ramadhani.

Currently, Jessica owns a fashion and cosmetic line, villa rental, as well as her own bakery which was named after her son.

Personal life
On December 11, 2013, Jessica married Ludwig Franz Willibald Maria Joseph Leonard Erbgraf von Waldburg Wolfegg Waldsee at Gereja Yesus Sejati, a Protestant Church in Jakarta. Ludwig was a German citizen who was 2 years younger than Jessica and the eldest son of Hereditary prince Johannes Franz Xaver Willibald Maria Joseph Philipp Jeningen Leonnard Fürst von Waldburg Wolfegg Waldsee, Châtelain of the Castle of Wolfegg and Head of the House of Waldburg. The wedding was attended by several of her relatives.

On January 8, 2014, the marriage was registered at the Civil Registry Office.

On July 21, 2014, Jessica gave birth to the couple's only child, a son named El Barack Alexander, in the United States.

On October 13, 2014, Jessica's husband filed a petition requesting annulment at South Jakarta state court. He also filed a lawsuit at East Jakarta state questioning the validity of marriage license. The first trial was set on November 12, 2014.

On April 14, 2015, East Jakarta state court dismissed the lawsuit with regards to the validity of the marriage license.

On October 15, 2015, the petition for annulment was granted and Jessica was officially divorced.

On June 15, 2019, Jessica officially announced her engagement to Richard Kyle, after one year of dating.

Jessica was a wet nurse for Gempita Nora Marten, the daughter of her friend Gisella Anastasia and Gading Marten.

Filmography

Film

Soap Opera 
 Kasmaran
 Kanaya
 My Best Friend's Sister
 Cinta Anak Majikan

Music Video

Television Movie 
 Ketika Wila Patah Hati (2008) as Wila
 Something About Bali (2010) as Bali
Gadis Pengantar Telur (2010) as Galuh
Cinta di Kandang Sapi (2009) as Seruni
Cinta Pura-Pura Nyasar (2010) as Melisa
Miss Clean Lebay (2012) as Mita
 Jejaka in Paradise (2010) as Chika
 Stay With Me Please (2010) as Lena
Cinta Tak Kenal Bosan (2010) as Tiara
Ada Cinta di Pulau Maimalu (2010) as Adelia
Jesi Bawa Lari Hatiku (2010) as Jesi
 Buton Island's Romantic Story (2009) as Angki
 Not My Sassy Girl (2011) as Sassy
Geng Vespa Terjerat Cinta (2011) as Cyntia
Never Ending Bakmi (2011) as Ami
 Calo Cinta (2012) as Vina
Ilana Pergi Ilina Menanti (2011) as Ilana dan Ilina
Ketemu Cinta di Metromini (2010) as Tania
Bad Boy's Diary 
Dibinatu Ada Cinta
Romansa di Pantai Panjang
Tiga Lawan Satu
Nona Sabrina
The Bad Luck Stiletto
 Alunan Cinta
 Nanno Si Nanny
Tertusuk Keris Cinta Ngatiman
Be My Valentine Siti Markonah
 Cewek Cantikku
 Cintaku Anak Majikan 
 Cinta Karung Beras
Kepentok Cinta Shahrukh Khan
Gue Berhak Jatuh Cinta
Jatuh Bangun Demi Cinta (2009)
 Terjaring Cinta Nelayan Cantik
 Aku Bidadarimu
 Cintaku Dibuat Mainan
 Tabrak Gue Dong
 Jangan Deportasi Cintaku
 Pangeran Kodok Mencari Cinta
 Romantika Cinta di Pasar Kambing
 SMS untuk Bidadariku
 Bukalah Hatimu Sedikit Untukku
 Juliet Sang Penakluk Arjuna
 Badai Pasti Kembali
I Love You Juminten (2011)
 Jaka Tarub Mencari Cinta

Album

Television Show

Advertisement

 Mobile Legends: Bang Bang (2017)
 D'Luxe Kintakun Collection (2017)
 Bintang Toejoe (2017) with Gilang dirga
 Komix Tube TVC (2013) with Marcel Chandrawinata
 Telkomsel 
 Revlon
 Ramayana
 Kopiko
 Campina
 Viva

Awards and nominations

References

External links
 

Living people
Actresses from Jakarta
Indonesian former Muslims
Indonesian Christians
Converts to Christianity from Islam
1988 births
21st-century Indonesian actresses
Indonesian film actresses
Indonesian television actresses
Indonesian people of Malay descent
Indonesian people of Chinese descent
Moroccan people of Malay descent
Saudi Arabian people of Malay descent